Deoxyhypusine synthase is an enzyme that in humans is encoded by the DHPS gene.

The unusual amino acid hypusine is formed posttranslationally and is only found in a single cellular protein, eukaryotic translation initiation factor 5A (EIF5A, EIF5A2). In the first step of hypusine biosynthesis, deoxyhypusine synthase catalyzes the NAD-dependent transfer of the butylamine moiety of spermidine to the epsilon-amino group of a specific lysine residue of the EIF5A precursor protein to form the intermediate deoxyhypusine residue. This gene consists of nine exons spanning 6.6 kb. Three transcript variants have been isolated. However, only transcript variant 1 encodes an active protein. The shorter variants may act as modulating factors of DHPS activity.

References

Further reading